Zohn Nunataks is a set of three nunataks, the largest being Cheeks Nunatak, rising to 1,310 m in the southwest part of Grossman Nunataks, Palmer Land. Mapped by United States Geological Survey (USGS) from surveys and U.S. Navy aerial photographs, 1961–68, and Landsat imagery, 1973–74. Named by Advisory Committee on Antarctic Names (US-ACAN) after Harry L. Zohn, Jr., USGS topographic engineer, a member of the USGS-BAS geological party to the Orville Coast, 1977–78.

Nunataks of Palmer Land